Norton Peak, at  above sea level is the third highest peak in the Smoky Mountains of Idaho. It is the 331st highest peak in Idaho. Miner Lake is on the west side of the peak, and Upper and Lower Norton lakes are south of the peak.

References 

Mountains of Idaho
Mountains of Blaine County, Idaho
Sawtooth National Forest